Dennis Hotel may refer to:

Hotels
 Dennis Hotel: listed on the National Register of Historic Places in St. Petersburg, Florida
 Dennis Hotel (Atlantic City, New Jersey): now a tower of Bally's Atlantic City

Other
 Dennis Hotels Pty Ltd v Victoria: 1960 court case before the High Court of Australia